Hyperplatys cana is a species of longhorn beetles of the subfamily Lamiinae. It was described by Henry Walter Bates in 1863, and is known from southeastern Brazil.

References

Beetles described in 1863
Endemic fauna of Brazil
Acanthocinini